Võ Hoài Phúc (Võ Đại Hoài Phúc) is a Vietnamese composer who quite unexpectedly and recklessly turned to the professional career of music when being a second-year student of Physics, Pedagogy University, HCMC.

Until now he has many songs popularized in Vietnam and abroad (Thuy Nga Paris by night), of which the most famous is “Hoang mang” bringing him the Favorite Musician Award 2007 [Lan Song Xanh – Voice of HCMC]

Being the youngest child in a family with 7 brothers and sisters, Vo Hoai Phuc is musician Hoai An's brother.

Summary 
Graduating in advanced composing course – HCMC Music Association, from 2005 Vo Hoai Phuc   worked for Ben Thanh Audio & Video Co. as an editor. He joined to edit and implement many music performances, CDs and cassette records.

He joined the Music Content Team as an editor at Zing News (2006-2008); Sóng Nhạc, Pops.vn (2008-2009) and Go.vn (2010–2011).

From 2011 Vo Hoai Phuc has been Director of Viet Artists comapy focus on Digital Music Copyright, Music Composing (for TVC, TV shows, Film, Game...), Event & Entertainment Show, Media Production, Artists Management and Performing Arts Academy.

Vo Hoai Phuctook part in shows:
 Executive Producer - Cửu Long Hội Ngộ (2006)
 Judge - BeU Honda (2010, 2012, 2013)
 Executive Producer - Dòng Thời Gian (2015)
 Music Director - Larue Tình Bạn Mãi Mãi (2016)

Songs 
Vo Hoai Phuc's popular songs:
 Hoang mang
 Khi cô đơn em nhớ ai
 Hai thế giới
 Ngày mai em rời xa
 Một đời em đã yêu
 Gọi tên ngày mới
 Phút cuối
 Yêu không hối hận
...

References 

Vietnamese composers
1977 births
Living people